The Lighthouse Winmore is a Hong Kong-registered oil tanker that in November, 2017, was seized for suspected violations of United Nations sanctions against North Korea.

See also
 Koti

References

Oil tankers
History of North Korea
Ships of Hong Kong